K-R-I-T (or simply "Krit") was a small automobile manufacturing company (1909–1916) based in Detroit, Michigan.

History

Krit Motor Car Company's name probably originated from Kenneth Crittenden, who provided financial backing and helped design the cars. The emblem of the cars was a swastika (a symbol that was not yet associated with Nazism, Nazi Germany, Adolf Hitler, or antisemitism).

Krit occupied two different sites during its history: the first one it took over from the Blomstrom car, and in 1911 moved to the works that had been used by R. M. Owen & Company who had moved to become Owen Magnetic.

In 1911 the KRIT Motor Company was purchased by Walter S Russel of the Russel Wheel and Foundry Company.

The cars were conventional 4-cylinder models and many were exported to Europe and Australia. In 1913 a six-cylinder car was introduced and Krit tried to increase sales by engineering cars for other marques. The outbreak of World War I seriously damaged the company and it failed in 1915. A few cars were subsequently assembled from remaining parts.

See also

1913 K-R-I-T "KT" 5-Passenger Touring at the National Automobile Museum.

References

Defunct motor vehicle manufacturers of the United States
Motor vehicle manufacturers based in Michigan
Vehicle manufacturing companies established in 1909
1909 establishments in Michigan
Defunct manufacturing companies based in Detroit

1900s cars
1910s cars
Brass Era vehicles
Cars introduced in 1909
Vehicle manufacturing companies disestablished in 1916